Our Little Girl is a 1935 American drama, in which Shirley Temple and Joel McCrea play the leading roles. The film was the final work of the veteran director, John S. Robertson.

The protagonist, Molly Middleton (Temple), is the daughter of a physician,  Donald Middleton (McCrea), and his neglected wife, Elsa (Rosemary Ames), who becomes attracted to her husband's best friend, Rolfe Brent (Lyle Talbot).

Our Little Girl is largely overshadowed not only by its predecessors, Bright Eyes and The Little Colonel, but also its immediate successors, Curly Top and The Littlest Rebel — all major hits for Temple that launched her international stardom. Unlike her other films of this period, it included no dancing and only one song. She played a character neither partially nor completely orphaned, as she had, or would, in nearly all of her other films. Our Little Girl was the penultimate film by Temple during her time at Fox in which she did not play an orphan. The last such film would be The Blue Bird: in her next thirteen movies, she would play the part of an orphan.

Plot
The doctor Don Middleton (Joel McCrea) is so immersed in his work that he neglects his wife, Elsa (Rosemary Ames), who begins spending more time with her husband's  best friend. The two develop an intimate attraction. Don and Elsa decide to divorce, ignorant of the effect on their daughter Molly (Shirley Temple). When Elsa decides to remarry, Molly runs away from home.

Cast
 Shirley Temple as Molly Middleton
 Rosemary Ames as Elsa Middleton
 Joel McCrea as Dr. Donald Middleton
 Lyle Talbot as Rolfe Brent
 Erin O'Brien-Moore as Sarah Boynton
 J. Farrell MacDonald as Hobo aka Mr. Tramp
 Poodles Hanneford as Circus Performer
 Margaret Armstrong as Amy
 Rita Owin as Alice
 Leonard Carey as Jackson
 Jack Baxley as Leyton - Druggist (uncredited)
 Jack Donohue as Actor (uncredited)
 Gus Van as Magician (uncredited)

Production

The original name of Our Little Girl was supposed to be Heaven's Gate, but was changed prior to its release out of fear people would confuse the title with the name of a cemetery. Temple, in her memoirs, wrote that she had a huge crush on McCrea but quickly avoided further flirtation after two notable delays caused by her. While playing a grassy field, two of her false teeth fell out and were not located, resulting in production being called off for the day. In another incident, there was a long delay from the setting up of the cameras. Unable to hold it in any further, she wet herself. Thoroughly embarrassed, it took much coaxing from her mother in the dressing room to convince her to go back out, resulting in further delays.

References

External links 
 
 
 

1935 films
American drama films
Films directed by John S. Robertson
American black-and-white films
Fox Film films
1935 drama films
1930s English-language films
1930s American films